A Scream from Silence is a 1979 Canadian drama film directed by Anne Claire Poirier and starring Julie Vincent. It competed in the Un Certain Regard section at the 1979 Cannes Film Festival. The film was selected as the Canadian entry for the Best Foreign Language Film at the 52nd Academy Awards, but was not accepted as a nominee.

It was later screened at the 1984 Festival of Festivals as part of Front & Centre, a special retrospective program of artistically and culturally significant films from throughout the history of Canadian cinema.

Plot
A young nurse named Suzanne is kidnapped, assaulted, and brutally raped in the back of a truck by a misogynist stranger. The nurse's rape and the aftermath are part of a film which a director and her editor are working on. From time to time, they pause the film to discuss their intentions and reactions to the film they are making. Mixed in with the story is documentary footage of the stories of other women who have been raped around the world.

Cast
 Julie Vincent as Suzanne
 Germain Houde as Le violeur
 Paul Savoie as Philippe
 Monique Miller as La réalisatrice
 Micheline Lanctôt as La monteuse
 Luce Guilbeault as Une cliente
 Christiane Raymond as La disciple
 Louise Portal as La comédienne
 Muriel Dutil as L'epouse (as Murielle Dutil)
 Julie Morand as La secrétaire
 Pierre Gobeil as Le policier
 Jean-Pierre Masson as Voice
 Michèle Mercure as La soeur de Philippe
 Léo Munger as Une violée
 André Pagé as Le gynécologue

Production
The film had a budget of $362,861.

Release
The film was shown by the Canadian Broadcasting Corporation on 10 April 1980.

See also
 List of submissions to the 52nd Academy Awards for Best Foreign Language Film
 List of Canadian submissions for the Academy Award for Best Foreign Language Film

References

Works cited

External links

1979 films
1979 drama films
1970s feminist films
Films directed by Anne Claire Poirier
National Film Board of Canada films
Films scored by Maurice Blackburn
Films about filmmaking
Films about rape
Films about violence against women
Medical-themed films
Canadian drama films
French-language Canadian films
1970s Canadian films